Elm Court may refer to:
 Elm Court (Lenox and Stockbridge, Massachusetts), straddles Lenox/Stockbridge line, is listed on the NRHP in Massachusetts
 Elm Court (Butler, Pennsylvania), listed on the NRHP in Butler County, Pennsylvania
 Elm Court (Newport, Rhode Island), a Gilded Age mansion in Newport.
 Elm Street Court, Urbana, Illinois